The women's ski halfpipe competition of the 2015 Winter Universiade was held at Sulayr Snowpark, Sierra Nevada, Spain on February 10, 2015.

Results

Qualification

Final

Women's halfpipe